Jeong Hyeon may refer to:
Jung Hyun (born 1994), South Korean baseball player
Chung Hyeon (born 1996), South Korean tennis player
Jung-hyun, Korean given name